Ruthenium hexafluoride, also ruthenium(VI) fluoride (RuF6), is a compound of ruthenium and fluorine and one of the seventeen known binary hexafluorides.

Synthesis 
Ruthenium hexafluoride is made by a direct reaction of ruthenium metal in a gas stream of fluorine and argon at 400–450 °C. The yields of this reaction are less than 10%.

 + 3  →

Description 
Ruthenium hexafluoride is a dark brown crystalline solid that melts at 54 °C. The solid structure measured at −140 °C is orthorhombic space group Pnma. Lattice parameters are a = 9.313 Å, b = 8.484 Å, and c = 4.910 Å. There are four formula units (in this case, discrete molecules) per unit cell, giving a density of 3.68 g·cm−3.

The RuF6 molecule itself (the form important for the liquid or gas phase) has octahedral molecular geometry, which has point group (Oh).  The Ru–F bond length is 1.818 Å.

References

Further reading 
 Gmelins Handbuch der anorganischen Chemie, System Nr. 63, Ruthenium, Supplement, pp. 266–268.

External links 
 Ruthenium hexafluoride at webelements.com.

Ruthenium compounds
Hexafluorides
Octahedral compounds